The Georgetown–St. John's men's basketball rivalry is a college basketball rivalry between the Georgetown Hoyas men's basketball team of Georgetown University and St. John's Red Storm men's basketball team of St. John's University. The first meeting between the two schools was on December 8, 1909 which was won by St. John's 41-26. The two teams played off and on since that first matchup until 1965, when they began annually scheduled games, and they only intensified when both programs became founding members of the Big East Conference in 1979. The rivalry was brought to national attention during the 1984-85 NCAA Division I men's basketball season when both programs were ranked #1 and #2 throughout the season and met on a total of four occasions, including during the 1985 Big East Championship and the 1985 Final Four.

The college basketball rivalry gained renewed interest when both schools remained in the new Big East Conference during the 2010-2014 NCAA conference realignment. Both programs are currently coached by their school's Hall of Fame players, Patrick Ewing and Chris Mullin from the 1984-85 season when the schools hired them to lead their programs in 2017 and 2015, respectively.

Game results

References

College basketball rivalries in the United States
Georgetown Hoyas men's basketball
St. John's Red Storm men's basketball